Aram Hur is a South Korean teacher, practicing humanist, educator, publisher, lecturer, and social entrepreneur.

Biography 
Aram Hur was born in Miryang, South Korea on March 4, 1971, and grew up in Busan. She received her BA and MA from Pusan National University and has lectured on literature, philosophy, art, linguistics and educational studies.

Career 
Hur is the founder and chairperson of Indigo Book Company (인디고 서원) which is located in Busan, South Korea.
 Opened on 28 August 2004, it is a humanities bookstore for young people which also hosts public events, educational movements, and social activities;<ref>[http://www.busanilbo.com/news2000/html/2008/0103/060020080103.1020103510.html Lee Sangheon, "Indigo's young Idealists seeking for Innovative Change-Makers around the world", Busan Ilbo(Daily Newspaper), 2008. 1. 3.] </ref> it is a combination of nonprofit book publisher, magazine (Humanities Magazine for Youths "INDIGO+ing"), bookstore, after-school course program, and community center. Indigo represents a vibrant progressive and humanistic counterweight with its idealism and engagement to the world. She is a founding member and chief director of Indigo Youth Book Fair. And she recently opened a vegetarian restaurant, Ecotopia- the combination of the words: ‘ecology’ and ‘utopia’, which has become a favorite cafe of many young idealists in the environmental and global-justice movements. All proceeds from Ecotopia are donated to Indigo's Library Projects in the remote villages of Nepal.

 Publications My Beautiful Girl, Indigo  (2005)Theme and Variations Vol. I/II (2006)Happy Readings in Indigo Seowon (2007)Toto meets Morrie-Humanities Class with Teacher Aram (2007)Youths with Creative Passion, Dreaming a Better World (2007)Living a Dream: A journey of Young Creative Idealists (2008)Youths dream of Righteous World, Communicating with the World (2009)This I Believe (2009)INDIGO+ing Bi-monthly Humanities Magazine for Youth (Korean/English), started 2006INDIGO Quarterly Humanities Magazine for Young People (English), started 2010Re-evaluation of Values: A Journey in Search of Core Values (2010)To Love Is To Read (2011)Demanding the Impossible: An Interview with Slavoj Žižek (Polity Press, 2013)Im Jong-eob, "Korean youths meeting Zizek-'Ignoring the power is also revolution'" Hankyoreh(Daily Newspaper), 2012. 3. 9.Kim Sanghoon, "'Common Good is Common Struggle for Freedom' by Slavoj Žižek", Busan Ilbo(Daily Newspaper), 2012. 3. 10.The Task of Living: An Interview with Zygmunt Bauman (2014)Jung Sangdo, "In the Eye of a True Sociologist", Kookje Daily News, 2014. 6. 27.The Center of Possibilities: An Interview with Kojin Karatani (2015)Jang Jeeyeong, "Listening to the thoughts of Japanese critic Karatani", Kookmin Ilbo (Daily Newspaper), 2015. 7. 3.Doing Democracy-Democracy for a New Generation 1 (2017)Poor Society, Noble Life-Democracy for a New Generation 2 (2017)The Eternal Boy-Democracy for a New Generation 3'' (2017)

Awards 
The Korea Publication Ethics Commission (2007) - Grand Prize
The People Who Make Our World Brighter (2007) - Korea Green Foundation
Everest Summit Award (2008) - Nepal Government & Today's Youth Asia
Young Achievers Award (2008) - TYA 
Young Korean Award (2009) - Grand Prize (First Winner)

References

External links 
Indigo Book Company (Indigo Seowon)
Indigo Global Humanities Project--Indigo Youth Book Fair

1971 births
Living people
Education writers
21st-century South Korean women writers
21st-century South Korean non-fiction writers
South Korean women non-fiction writers
People from Miryang
People from Busan
Pusan National University alumni